William Filby may refer to:
William Filby (Roman Catholic priest) (c. 1557–1582), Roman Catholic priest and martyr in medieval England
William Filby (Anglican priest) (1933–2009), Anglican priest